Washington Poe (July 13, 1800 – October 7, 1876) was an American Whig politician and lawyer from Georgia.

Background
Born in Augusta, Georgia, Poe studied law at the Litchfield Law School in 1823, and was admitted to the Georgia bar in May 1825. Poe worked in Oliver Prince's law practice and became Solicitor General of the Macon Circuit Court. In January 1836, he was appointed the delegate from Central Georgia  and his job was to determine the route of a railroad from Cincinnati, Ohio to the South. In the same year, Poe became the Vice President of the Macon Lyceum and Library Association.

In 1840, Washington Poe was a speaker and delegate for Bibb County at a convention to ratify the anti Van Buren Presidential slate. In 1841, he was elected mayor of Macon, Georgia. He had been solicitor-general for the Macon circuit. During the American Civil War, he was the postmaster of Macon, Georgia.

In 1844, Poe was elected to the United States House of Representatives, but resigned. He was a supporter of Henry Clay and served as the President of Macon's Henry Clay Club in 1844. 
Poe was a delegate to The Georgia Secession Convention of 1861 in Milledgeville, GA —voting in favor of secession and signing Georgia's Ordinance of Secession on January 19, 1861. During the Civil War, Poe served as Postmaster and participated in public life.

Family
Washington Poe married Selina Shirley Norman on December 24, 1829.

See also
 List of signers of the Georgia Ordinance of Secession
 Confederate States of America, causes of secession, "Died of states' rights"
 List of members-elect of the United States House of Representatives who never took their seats

Notes

|-

1800 births
1876 deaths
19th-century American lawyers
19th-century American politicians
Georgia (U.S. state) lawyers
Georgia (U.S. state) postmasters
Georgia (U.S. state) Whigs
Mayors of Macon, Georgia
People of Georgia (U.S. state) in the American Civil War
Politicians from Augusta, Georgia
Signers of the Georgia Ordinance of Secession